Charlotte Stevens (1902–1946) was an American film actress of the silent era playing a mixture of lead and supporting roles.

Selected filmography
 Mine to Keep (1923)
 The Tornado (1924)
 The Mirage (1924)
 One Law for the Woman (1924)
 Riders Up (1924)
 Flying Hoofs (1925)
 With Kit Carson Over the Great Divide (1925)
 The Merry Cavalier (1926)
 The Heart of a Coward (1926)
 King of the Pack (1926)
 The Cancelled Debt (1927)
 The Coward (1927)
 Thunder Riders (1928)

References

Bibliography
 Munden, Kenneth White. The American Film Institute Catalog of Motion Pictures Produced in the United States, Part 1. University of California Press, 1997.

External links

1902 births
1946 deaths
American film actresses
Actresses from Chicago
20th-century American actresses
American silent film actresses